Wagenaar is a Dutch occupational surname meaning "wagoner" or "wagon builder" (cartwright). Variant forms are De Wagenaar, Wagenaars,  Wag(h)enaer (archaic), and Wagener. The name is shared by the following people:

 (born 1939), Dutch journalist
Aad Wagenaar (born 1940), Dutch Reformed Protestant politician
Alexander Wagenaar (born 1955), American epidemiologist
Bernard Wagenaar (1894–1971), Dutch-born American composer, pupil but not family of Johan Wagenaar
Diderik Wagenaar (born 1946), Dutch composer and musical theorist, second cousin of Johan Wagenaar
Gerben Wagenaar (1912–1993), Dutch Communist Party politician
Jan Wagenaar (waterpolo) (born 1965), Dutch water polo player
Jan Wagenaar (1709–1773), Dutch historian
Jan Wagenaar (1937–2022), Dutch harness racing driver
Jelle Wagenaar (born 1989), Dutch football defender
Johan Wagenaar (1862–1941), Dutch composer and organist
Josh Wagenaar (born 1985), Canadian football goalkeeper
Lucas Janszoon Waghenaer (1533/34–1606), Dutch sailor and cartographer
Rene Wagenaar (1954 -2007), Dutch Professor of Information and Communication Technology 
Willem Albert Wagenaar (1941–2011), Dutch psychologist
Zacharias Wagenaer (1614–1668), German-born Dutch merchant, illustrator and Governor of the Cape Colony

References

Dutch-language surnames
Occupational surnames